Welshpool is a town in the South Gippsland region of Victoria, Australia.

Welshpool is a town with lots to offer with many shops from general stores, fuel station, hotel motel and a rural transaction centre supported by Bendigo Bank. Close proximity to Port Welshpool beach and boat ramp.

Notes and references

Towns in Victoria (Australia)
Shire of South Gippsland